The 1951–52 season was the 72nd season of competitive football in England.

Overview
Four years after guiding them to glory in the FA Cup, Matt Busby guided Manchester United to their first league title triumph in 41 years. While still captained by Johnny Carey and featuring several other players from the 1948 FA Cup winning team, Busby was now giving regular action to young players including Roger Byrne, Johnny Berry and Jackie Blanchflower, and had already invested in the future by making a move for the young goalkeeper Ray Wood.

Tottenham Hotspur, the previous season's champions, had to settle for second place this season.

Newcastle United retained the FA Cup, the centrepiece of their team being the forward line-up of Jackie Milburn and the Chilean brothers George and Ted Robledo.

Honours

Notes = Number in parentheses is the times that club has won that honour. * indicates new record for competition

Football League

First Division

Second Division

Third Division North

Third Division South

Top goalscorers

First Division
George Robledo (Newcastle United) – 33 goals

Second Division
Derek Dooley (Sheffield Wednesday) – 46 goals

Third Division North
Andy Graver (Lincoln City) – 36 goals

Third Division South
Ronnie Blackman (Reading) – 39 goals

References